Lora Jessica Webster (born August 26, 1986) is an American Paralympic volleyballist. She won a 2018 Theresa Award.

Early life
Webster was born in Phoenix, Arizona. By the time she turned 11 she was diagnosed with osteosarcoma in her left tibia. She underwent a rotationplasty procedure to remove the cancerous bone, and lost her knee that way. In 1998 she got a prosthetic leg. In 2004, she graduated from Cactus Shadows High School in Cave Creek, Arizona with Gene Autry Courage Award which she shared with Lynn Swan. While she was in high school she competed in track and diving at Lincoln East High School in Lincoln, Nebraska.

Career
In 2003, she won a gold medal in Parapan American Games and in 2004 participated in 2004 Paralympic Games, where she won a bronze medal. She won a silver medal for her participation at 2008 Paralympic Games in Beijing, China. The same year she got a bronze medal for her participation at World Organization Volleyball for Disabled where she also won an Intercontinental Cup. She also got two gold medals in 2009, one for Parapan American Zonal Championship and another for EuroCup. In 2016, she competed at the 2016 Summer Paralympics.  At the 2016 Rio Games she won a gold medal. At the 2018 World ParaVolley World Championships, she won a silver medal. At the 2020 Tokyo Summer Paralympics, realized in 2021, she won a gold medal.

Personal life
Webster married Paul Bargellini in 2010. Together they have a daughter and two sons. In the February 2006 issue of Cosmopolitan magazine, she was named Cosmos first Fun Fearless Female Reader and also won a prize of $10,000. She studied broadcasting at the University of Central Oklahoma. In 2017, she graduated from Stony Brook University.

In 2019, Webster announced her candidacy for Town of Hempstead Town Council as a Democrat.

References

External links
 
 Lora Webster at USA Volleyball
 
 

1986 births
Living people
American sitting volleyball players
Women's sitting volleyball players
Paralympic volleyball players of the United States
Paralympic silver medalists for the United States
Paralympic bronze medalists for the United States
Paralympic medalists in volleyball
Volleyball players at the 2004 Summer Paralympics
Volleyball players at the 2008 Summer Paralympics
Volleyball players at the 2012 Summer Paralympics
Medalists at the 2004 Summer Paralympics
Medalists at the 2008 Summer Paralympics
Medalists at the 2012 Summer Paralympics
Sportspeople from Phoenix, Arizona